Jibon Saathi  is an Indian Bengali Language Romantic Drama Thriller television series which is premiered on 5 October 2020 on Bengali General Entertainment Channel Zee Bangla and is also available on the digital platform ZEE5, even before TV telecast. The show is produced by Snehasish Chakraborty's Blues Productions and stars Diya Basu, Sayan Karmakar, Shrabani Bunia, Rudrajit Mukherjee and Indrani Dutta lead roles.

Plot
Priyam, who gets married off to a man called Sankalpo, who was previously in love with her elder sister Jhelum. She struggles to win him over and pursue her professional goals at the same time. As fate would have it, Priom has to marry Sankalpo, the son of Salankara, a successful businesswoman in the fashion industry, because of her father's wishes. However, Sankalpo only has eyes for Jhelum, who in turn gets married off to Turno, a man from a much more humble background. Priyam is determined to win over her husband despite all odds. She has a warm and charming personality, and a heart of gold. However, just as she makes a breakthrough in her relationship with Turno, Jhelum's husband passes away, and she comes to live with Priyam and Sankalpo.

Cast

Main
 Diya Basu as Priyam Banerjee (née Chatterjee): Sankalpo's wife, Jhelum's sister and Salankara Devi's daughter-in-law. She is a kindhearted and cheerful girl. She does not attract a lot of attention because of her looks. Priyam is also artistic and skilled at threading work and stitches.
 Sayan Karmakar as Sankalpo Banerjee: Priyam's husband, Shalankara Devi's son, and Jhelum's former fiancée. He has no interest in his mother's vast saree business. He is an honest police officer. He also falls in love with Jhelum but he married Priom without interest.
 Shrabani Bhunia as Jhelum Ganguly (née Chatterjee): Turno's wife and Priyam's elder sister. She is beautiful and quiet girl. She has been in love with Turno for ten years, who happens to be a medical representative and later she marries him.
 Rudrajit Mukherjee as Turno Ganguly: Jhelum's husband, a medical representative by profession, was calm and composed. Initially he had to face a lot for not being so successful in his life and he used to keep a low-key. But he was shot by Sankalpo and everyone thought he died but he isn't dead. He has completely changed, from his look, body language, voice, everything. The shoot out incident changed his life.
 Indrani Dutta as Shalankara Banarjee: Bivash's wife, Sankalpo and Sanchita's mother and Priyam's mother-in-law. She is owner of a massive saree enterprises. She was obsessed with anything that she found beautiful, and absolutely hated anything that was not, she loathed Priyam for being outspoken and not excessively pretty. But later, she realised her mistake.

Recurring
 Dipankar De as Molinath Banerjee aka Deda: Bivash, Subhash, Mita, Oishani and Koushani's father 
 Biplab Banerjee as Bivash Banerjee: Molinath's son, Shalankara's husband, Sankalpo and Sanchita's father, Priyam's father-in-law.
 Raja Chatterjee as Subhash Banerjee: Molinath's son, Arshi's husband, Doyel's father, Sankalpo and Sanchita's uncle.
 Mallika Banerjee as Arshi Banerjee: Subhash's wife, Doyel's mother, Sankalpo and Sanchita's aunt.
 Sargami Rumpa as Doyel Banerjee: Subhash and Arshi's daughter, Sankalpo and Sanchita's cousin sister.
 Lekha Chatterjee as Sanchita Banerjee: Shalankara and Bivash's daughter, Sankalpo's younger sister.
 Rupsha Chakraborty as Oishani Banerjee: Molinath's daughter, Rick's wife.
 Neel Mukherjee as Rick Sen: Oishani and Koushani's husband.
 Meghna Haldar as Koushani Banerjee / Kashmira Singh: Molinath's daughter, Oishani's twin sister, Rick's second wife.
 Meghna Mukherjee as Meghna: Durba's daughter, Sankalpo and Sanchita's cousin sister.
 Swarnakamal Dutta as Mita Mukherjee: Molinath's daughter, Kush's wife.
 Judhajit Banerjee as Kush Mukherjee: Mita's husband. 
 Dolon Roy as Durba: Meghna's mother, Sankalpo and Sanchita's aunt.
 Pooja Ganguly as Riddima Sen: Rick's sister.
 Taniya Paul as Tinni: Rick's cousin sister 
 Biswanath Basu as Bipin Sadhukhan: Shalankara's broker.
 Suparna Patra as Suparna Biswas: Subhash's second wife and Employee of saree business.
 Supriyo Dutta as Raghab Chatterjee: a retired police Officer, Priyam, Jhelum, Nilum and Sanju's father. Sankalpo and Turno's father-in-law.
 Uma Bardhan as Uma Chatterjee: Priyam, Jhelum, Nilum and Sanju's mother. Sankalpo and Turno's mother-in-law.
 Sudip Sengupta as Sanju Chatterjee: Raghab and Uma's son, Priyam, Jhelum and Nilum's brother
 Arpita Dutta Chowdhury as Shima: Uma's sister, Priyam, Jhelum, Nilum and Sanju's aunt.
 Jayanta Dutta Barman as Turno's Brother.
 Sayantani Majumdar as Turno's Sister-in-law.
 Arijita Mukhopadhyay as Champa: Saree laborer of Kamalpur
 Maadhurima Chakraborty as Sunidhi Basu / Nidhi: Sankalpo's fiancée.
 Joy Badlani as Joy Bandari: Sunidhi's business partner, Subhash's former friend. 
 Arghya Mukherjee as Don: Priyam's Advertising Director
 Ayeashrya Chatterjee as Baibhabi: Turno's fake wife, Sunidhi's cousin sister.
 Sukanya Chatterjee as Priya Sen: Priyam's rival.
 Kushal Papai Bhowmick as Kushal: Sanchita's husband.
 Soumodip Singha Roy as Barun: movie director.
 Sudipa Basu as Kanika: Kushal's aunt.
 Nondini Roy as Nondini: Kanika's daughter, Kushal's cousin sister.

Adaptations

Reception

Ratings

References

External links
 Official website

Bengali-language television programming in India
Zee Bangla original programming
2020 Indian television series debuts
Indian drama television series
2022 Indian television series endings